The 10th Victim is a 1965 science fiction film directed and co-written by Elio Petri, starring Marcello Mastroianni, Ursula Andress, Elsa Martinelli, and Salvo Randone. An international co-production between Italy and France, it is based on Robert Sheckley's 1953 short story "Seventh Victim".

Taking place in the year 2079 in the aftermath of World War III, the film's focus is on a government-endorsed program known as "The Big Hunt", whereby contestants from around the world act as "hunters" and "victims" in two-person battles to the death as a means of avoiding mass warfare. The plot follows veteran Big Hunt contestants Caroline Meredith (Andress) and Marcello Poletti (Mastroianni), who are respectively assigned the roles of hunter and victim for one such confrontation, which is complicated by their budding romance. Like Petri's other films, The 10th Victim is a work of socio-political satire, while also combining science fiction themes with conventions of the commedia all'italiana genre.

An avid reader of science fiction, Petri began work on an adaptation of Sheckley's story in 1961; producer Carlo Ponti came onboard the project due to the involvement of Mastroianni. A variety of screenwriters worked on the script to varying degrees without receiving an onscreen credit, including Suso Cecchi D'Amico, Nate Monaster and Ernesto Gastaldi. Ponti's lack of interest in the science fiction genre led to his mandating of more comedic elements in the story against Petri's wishes, including altering its original, pessimistic ending. Backed by financial support from Joseph E. Levine's Embassy Pictures, filming took place primarily on location in Rome and New York City from June to September 1964; produced at the height of the pop art movement in Italy, Petri sought to create a vision of the future that juxtaposes that style's imagery with Rome's ancient and modern architectural structures, such as the Colosseum and the EUR district.

Upon release, The 10th Victim performed below Ponti's expectations in Italy and received mixed reviews from critics. In the decades since its initial release, the film has garnered a cult following, and its imagery has been referenced or parodied in other films, notably the Austin Powers franchise; it is also considered to be a forerunner to works depicting televised fights to the death, such as The Hunger Games. A novelization of the film, written by Sheckley, was published in 1966, this was followed by two sequels, Victim Prime and Hunter/Victim in 1987 and 1988, respectively. Although several attempts to produce a remake of The 10th Victim have been announced, none have entered production.

Plot
In the 21st century, World War III has recently ended. To prevent a fourth war, individuals with violent tendencies get a chance to kill in "The Big Hunt", the most popular form of entertainment in the world, which also attracts participants who are looking for fame and fortune. It includes ten rounds for each competitor, five as the hunters and five as the victims. The survivor of ten rounds becomes extremely wealthy and retires.

Caroline Meredith is a huntress who has just killed her ninth victim and is looking for a tenth. To maximize financial gain, Meredith wants to get a perfect kill in front of the cameras as she has negotiated a major sponsorship from the Ming Tea Company. Marcello Poletti is assigned as the victim; his winnings from six kills have already been spent by his mistress, Olga, and his ex-wife, Lidia.

Caroline goes to Rome and impersonates a reporter whose assignment is to study the sexual preoccupations of Italian men. She requests an interview with Marcello at the Temple of Venus. Suspicious, Marcello arranges for Caroline to be eaten by a crocodile before the cameras of a competing television company, but she escapes. Caroline lures Marcello to the beach and convinces him that she is in love with him. She drugs Marcello and hauls him back to the Temple of Venus.

Caroline shoots Marcello in front of the television cameras, but Marcello survives because he has loaded the gun with blanks. He then shoots her but she is saved by her bulletproof armor plate. Marcello and Caroline decide to escape from the Big Hunt and go on a plane, where they decide to get married. The movie ends with the pilot shooting flowers to the two.

Differences from the original story
The original short story was written from the point of view of a man hunting his seventh target, a woman, whereas in the movie she is the hunter.  He finds her apparently defenceless sitting in a café.  Talking to her, she tells him how she is new to the game but could not bear to kill her own target, and now expects to die.  The hunter falls in love with his victim, as in the movie, and eventually reveals who he is.  She has tricked him; she shoots him, joining the ranks of the "Tens".

The story was adapted for radio on X Minus One in 1957.

Cast

 Marcello Mastroianni as Marcello Polletti
 Ursula Andress as Caroline Meredith
 Elsa Martinelli as Olga
 Salvo Randone as Professor
 Massimo Serato as Lawyer Rossi
 Milo Quesada as Rudi
 Luce Bonifassy as Lidia Poletti
 George Wang as Chinese Hunter
 Evi Rigano as Victim
 Walter Williams as Martin
 Richard Armstrong as Cole
 Anita Sanders as Relaxatorium Hostess
 Mickey Knox as Chet
 Jacques Herlin as Masoch Club Owner
 Wolfgang Hillinger as Baron Von Aschenberg

Release
The 10th Victim was released in Italy on December 3, 1965. The film grossed a little over 620 million lire in Italy upon its theatrical release. The film was distributed abroad, including in the United States and Canada by Embassy Pictures in late December 1965.

Reception
On review aggregator Rotten Tomatoes, the film holds a score of 80% based on 10 reviews, with an average rating of 7.35/10. In contemporary reviews, the Monthly Film Bulletin praised the visuals of the film, but stated that "the film is never quite as much fun as it should be, possibly because of rather ponderous dubbing and possibly because imaginative camera angles cannot totally make up for lapses in narrative." Bosley Crowther of The New York Times noted a "wildly imaginative plot" but declared the film overall to be "a clever but patently self-conscious exercise ... The cleverness is so insistent that it soon becomes excessive and absurd, and the gamesmanship of the satire becomes too cute, too much a bore." Variety found the film superior to Jean-Luc Godard's Alphaville, praising both Mastroianni and Andress, as well as Elsa Martinelli and Massimo Serato. The review also noted the cinematography of Gianni di Venanzo. Richard L. Coe of The Washington Post wrote that the film is "not handled so crisply as the material promises", finding that director Elio Petri "did not find quite the exact, cohesive tone such material demands. The result is curiously pedestrian." Algis Budrys of Galaxy Science Fiction described Sheckley's novelization as "a reasonably good chase novel" which would, nonetheless, disappoint readers, whether they wanted a literary version of the film's Italian satire and symbolism or the 'chilling futurama of legalized manslaughter' the cover promised.

In popular culture

The movie is an international cult classic whose wild action and sexy style has influenced a generation of movies, from  Death Race 2000 (1975 film) to The Running Man and the Austin Powers series. It was also the first movie to feature the reality TV death game theme, which was later used in other works such as Battle Royale,  Series 7: The Contenders, and The Hunger Games.

In the early 1990s, comedian and actor Mike Myers, along with musicians Susanna Hoffs and Matthew Sweet, started a faux British 1960s band whose members adopted personas from that era. The band named itself Ming Tea, after the company that sponsored Andress' character in the film.

See also
 Assassin (game)
 Battle Royale
 Death Race
 The Hunger Games
 The Most Dangerous Game
 The Running Man (film)
 Series 7: The Contenders
 The Tournament (film)

References

Footnotes

Sources

Further reading 
  Pdf.

External links

 
 

1965 films
1960s dystopian films
1960s science fiction films
Films set in 2079
French science fiction films
Italian science fiction films
1960s Italian-language films
Films directed by Elio Petri
Girls with guns films
Films based on short fiction
Films about snuff films
Adaptations of works by Robert Sheckley
Films produced by Carlo Ponti
Films about death games
Films about hunters
1960s chase films
Films scored by Piero Piccioni
1960s Italian films
1960s French films
Films about World War III